Ankpa is a Local Government Area in Kogi State, Nigeria. Its headquarters are in the town of Ankpa on the A233 highway in the west of the area at.

It has an area of 1,200 km and a population of 267,353 at the 2006 census.

By 2016, the population had swelled to 359,300.

The postal code of the area is 270.

The northeasterly line of equal latitude and longitude passes through the Local Government Area.

History of Ankpa Kingdom 
Ankpa, a large community in Kogi state, Nigeria was founded by Atiyele, the grandson of Abutu Ejeh, the founder of the Igala Kingdom. Abutu Ejeh, who was of Jukun descent established hegemony over Idah about four centuries ago. After his death, his son, Idoko, ascended the throne as the Attah and paramount leader of the Igala Kingdom. Idoko had two(2) sons: Atiyele and Ayegba. Ankpa kingdom at that time comprised: the present Ankpa and Olamaboro local government areas which extend to Idoma land; as far as Igumale and up to Ete and Enugu-Ezike in Anambra state. While Idah was made up of the present Idah, Dekina, Ofu, and Bassa local government areas extending as far as Lokoja in the present Kogi Central and was part of Onitsha at some point.

Ankpa Local Government Area
Ankpa Local Government Area has its administrative headquarters in Ankpa and the area is made of many towns, wards and villages such as Enjema, Ojoku, Abache, Abo, Acherane, Adde, Aguma, Aka, Akwu, Ankpa, Atuma, Biraidu, Ebakpoti, Ede, Efiwo, & others. Ankpa Local Government Area is one of the local government areas in Kogi state having 3 major district areas, 13 wards represented by 13 councilors each and many villages under the districts.

Ankpa LGA was created with the main aim of attracting government's attention to people at the grassroots level. With this aim, they collect allocation from the federal government for socio-economic development.

References

Local Government Areas in Kogi State